Beginci is a Malayo-Polynesian language spoken in Indonesia. It was added to ISO 639-3 in 2020, after splitting it and Gerai from Semandang.

References

External links
Ethnologue entry for Beginci

Languages of Indonesia
Land Dayak languages